Dorothy Poynton-Hill (née Poynton, later Teuber; July 17, 1915 – May 18, 1995) was an American diver who competed at the 1928, 1932 and 1936 Summer Olympics. She won the 10 m platform event in 1932 and 1936, while in the 3 m springboard she took a silver in 1928 and a bronze in 1936. In 1928, she became the youngest Olympian to win a medal and, in 1936, the first Olympic diver to win the 10 m platform twice.

After retiring from competitions, Poynton-Hill ran an aquatic club in Los Angeles and appeared in several TV commercials. In 1968, she was inducted into the International Swimming Hall of Fame.

See also
 List of members of the International Swimming Hall of Fame

References

External links

HickokSports profile
dataOlympics profile

1915 births
1995 deaths
American female divers
Divers at the 1928 Summer Olympics
Divers at the 1932 Summer Olympics
Divers at the 1936 Summer Olympics
Olympic gold medalists for the United States in diving
Olympic silver medalists for the United States in diving
Olympic bronze medalists for the United States in diving
Medalists at the 1936 Summer Olympics
Medalists at the 1932 Summer Olympics
Medalists at the 1928 Summer Olympics
20th-century American women
20th-century American people